125 Rooms of Comfort is a 1974 Canadian drama film directed by Patrick Loubert.

The film stars Tim Henry as Billie Joyce, a gay former musician who has been involuntarily institutionalized in an asylum by his family since showing up to his father's funeral in drag. When his father's will leaves him possession of a smalltown hotel in St. Thomas, Ontario, he returns home intending to sell the hotel to American real estate developer Oscar Kidd (Robert A. Silverman), but soon finds himself in the position of defending the rights of the hotel's staff against Kidd's renovation plans.

Cast
 Tim Henry as Billie Joyce
 Jackie Burroughs as Bobbie Kidd
 Robert Warner as Jim McKeagan
 Robert A. Silverman as Oscar Kidd 
 Les Barker as Leo Basho
 Sean Sullivan as Jack
 Michael Lewis as Pete
 Jackie Crossland as Marge
 Marcia Diamond as Doris
 Russ Little as Announcer
 Leonard Glenn as Byron Joyce
 Bob Vinci as Couple in Bed
 Enza Vinci as Couple in Bed

Critical response
Robert Fothergill of Cinema Canada wrote that the film featured strong cinematography and editing, but that its script lacked a coherent narrative centre, and ultimately analyzed the film as a mangled metaphor for Canadian nationalism.

Awards
The film was a nominee for Best Feature Film at the 26th Canadian Film Awards in 1975, but did not win.

References

External links 
 

1974 films
1974 comedy-drama films
1974 LGBT-related films
Canadian comedy-drama films
Canadian LGBT-related films
English-language Canadian films
Films set in hotels
Films shot in Ontario
LGBT-related comedy-drama films
Films set in Ontario
1970s English-language films
1970s Canadian films